Sri Kanyaka Parameshwari Kathe is a 1966 Indian Kannada-language film, directed and produced by Hunsur Krishnamurthy. The film stars Rajkumar, B. M. Venkatesh, Nagendra Rao and H. R. Shastry. The film has musical score by Rajan–Nagendra. H. R. Bhargava was the associate director of this movie.

Cast

Rajkumar as Dinna
B. M. Venkatesh
R. Nagendra Rao
H. R. Shastry
Narasimharaju
Subbanna
Vasu
Dinesh
Shankar
Dwarakish
K. S. Ashwath
H. K. Shastry
Basappa
Master Basavaraju
Guptha
Ranganath
Raghu
Pandari Bai
Kalpana
M. Jayashree
Ramadevi
Sharada
R. T. Rama
Indira

Soundtrack
The music was composed by Rajan–Nagendra.

References

External links
 
 

1966 films
1960s Kannada-language films
Films scored by Rajan–Nagendra
Films directed by Hunsur Krishnamurthy